Tokorats is the second studio album by Australian musician Jonti. It was released on 3 November 2017 through Future Classic in Australia and Stones Throw Records internationally.

Track listing

References

2017 albums
Stones Throw Records albums